Tiradentes is a metro station on São Paulo Metro Line 1-Blue, located in the district of Bom Retiro, in São Paulo.

Characteristics
It is an underground station, with structure in apparent concrete and island platform.

Average station demand
The average entrance of the station is 19,000 passengers per day, according to São Paulo Metro data. It is the less crowded station in the central region and the third to receive fewer people per day in the line, behind Jardim São Paulo–Ayrton Senna and Carandiru stations.

References

São Paulo Metro stations
Railway stations located underground in Brazil